Emma Aicher (born 13 November 2003) is a Swedish born-German World Cup alpine ski racer who also holds Swedish citizenship. In the alpine World Cup, she competes in all disciplines apart from giant slalom, though she skied it on the World Championships.

Her achievements include an Olympic silver medal and a bronze medal in the World Championships, both in team events.

Career
A daughter of a Swedish mother and a German father,  Aicher grew up in Sundsvall where she started skiing and joined the local Slalomklubb. Later, she moved with her parents to Engelberg (Switzerland) and then back to Sundsvall.

In March 2019 she won the U16 Slalom of the FIS Children Cup, representing Sweden. Later that year, she took part in her first FIS races. In 2020, she joined the German Ski Association, for the reason of ″better training opportunities in the Alps″. Making her debut in the Europa Cup in December 2020, she took her first podium in Slalom in January 2021.

Three weeks later, Aicher represented Germany at the World Championships, where she won bronze medal in the team event. That November on her eighteenth birthday, she made her World Cup debut in a parallel giant slalom at Lech/Zürs, Austria.

World Cup results

Season standings

Top ten results
0 podiums, 1 top ten

World Championship results

Olympic Games results

References

External links

2003 births
Living people
German female alpine skiers
Swedish female alpine skiers
Alpine skiers at the 2022 Winter Olympics
Olympic alpine skiers of Germany
Medalists at the 2022 Winter Olympics
Olympic medalists in alpine skiing
Olympic silver medalists for Germany
People from Sundsvall
Sportspeople from Västernorrland County
Swedish people of German descent
21st-century German women